Andreas Ntousis (born 4 October 1984) is a Greek footballer who plays for Ethnikos Piraeus in the Football League 2 as a goalkeeper.

References
 Andreas Ntousis

1984 births
Living people
Ethnikos Piraeus F.C. players
Kallithea F.C. players
Ethnikos Asteras F.C. players
Apollon Smyrnis F.C. players
Footballers from Athens
Greek footballers
Association football goalkeepers